JLT is the eighth solo studio album by Joe Lynn Turner.

Track listing
 "In Cold Blood" – 4:18 (Joe Lynn Turner)
 "Jump Start" – 3:29 (Turner/Bob Held/Chris Marksbury)
 "Dirty Deal" – 4:09 (Turner/Marksbury)
 "Love Don't Live Here" – 5:35 (Turner/Held/Al Pitrelli)
 "Excess" – 5:30 (Turner/Marksbury)
 "Let's Go" – 3:22 (Turner/Marksbury)
 "Cryin' Out Loud" – 5:48 (Turner/Held/Pitrelli)
 "Lie" – 4:13 (Turner/Held/Marksbury)
 "Fantasize" – 4:46 (Turner/Marksbury)
 "Blood Fire" – 4:53 (Turner)
 "Drivin' With My Eyes Closed" – 3:25 (Turner/Held)
 "Hit the Switch" – 3:47 (Turner/Held)
 "Reprise" (Instrumental) – 1:39 (Turner)
MTM version (MTM Records 0681–74) omits track 8

Personnel
Joe Lynn Turner: Vocals
Al Pitrelli: Guitars (Tracks 1–11)
Greg Smith: Bass (Tracks 1, 2, 5-7 & 11)
Eric Czar: Bass (Tracks 3, 4, 8, 12 & 13)
John O'Reilly: Drums

Guest Musicians

Chris Caffery: Guitars (Track 1)
Joe Bonamassa: Guitars (Tracks 2, 3 & 5)
Karl Cochran: Guitars (Tracks 12 & 13)
Chris Marksbury: Guitars (Track 6), Backing vocals (Tracks 6 & 8)
John Bongiovanni: Bass guitar (Track 9)
Bob Held: Bass (Track 10) and Backing vocals (Track 6)
Carmine Giglo: Keyboards (Tracks 1 & 7)
Lloyd Landsman: Keyboards (Track 3)
Jane Mangini: Keyboards (Tracks 4 & 10)
Paul Morris: Keyboards (Track 11)
Preston Nichols: Cowbell(Track 6)

Backing Vocals

Max Velez: Backing vocals (Track 6)
Mark Wexler: Backing vocals (Track 6)
Sheryl Wilson: Backing vocals (Track 12)
Ricky Taranto: Backing vocals (Track 12)
Tony Bruno: Backing vocals (Track 12)
Kyle Salvador: Backing vocals (Track 12)
Matthew Lane: Backing vocals (Track 12)

Production
Executive Producer – Mark Wexler
Mixing – Gary Tole
Engineer – Gary Tole and Max Velez

References

Joe Lynn Turner albums
2003 albums